Baktygul Janybekovna Jeenbaeva (born 31 July 1960) is a Kyrgyzstani politician who has been the country's Finance Minister since December 2018.

Early life and education
Jeenbaeva was born on 31 July 1960 in Bishkek, then called Frunze and part of the Soviet Union. Her father, Janybek Jeenbaev, a nuclear physicist, was president of the Kyrgyz Academy of Sciences. She has degrees in mathematics and economics from the Kyrgyz National University.

Career
Jeenbaeva worked as an economist for the production association Ak-Tilek from 1985 until 1992. She was then an economist at the Department of External and Public Relations. In 2007 she became General Director of the New Television Network. In 2010 she became acting Chair of the National Bank of the Kyrgyz Republic and in 2016, chair of the Board of the State Mortgage Company. At the time, she publicly lamented the Bank's lack of independence.

Jeenbaeva has been a member of the Akshumkar political party since 2007. From 6 July 2018 until 12 December 2018 she was an advisor to the president of Kyrgyzstan.

On 12 December 2018, the Parliament approved Jeenbaeva's candidacy as Minister of Finance with 101 members voting for her after Prime Minister Mukhammedkalyi Abylgaziev proposed her for the position. She was officially appointed by President Sooronbay Jeenbekov the following day.

In 2019, Jeenbaeva was called as a witness in a criminal case against the Legal Representation Center for the alleged embezzlement of funds.

Personal life
Jeenbaeva is divorced and has a son.

References

Living people
1960 births
People from Bishkek
Chairmen of National Bank of the Kyrgyz Republic
Women government ministers of Kyrgyzstan
Finance ministers of Kyrgyzstan
Female finance ministers
Kyrgyz National University alumni
21st-century Kyrgyzstani women politicians
21st-century Kyrgyzstani politicians